

The Fauvel AV.44 was a design for an unorthodox light aircraft produced in France in the 1970s. The work of Charles Fauvel, it was based on his pre-war AV.10 and like it, was a tailless monoplane with a reverse-delta planform and side-by-side seating in an enclosed cabin. The AV.44 featured considerably more modern aerodynamics and accommodation for two passengers in place of the AV.10's one. Five examples were under construction in 1977.

Specifications (as designed)

References

 
 

Notes

1970s French sport aircraft
Fauvel aircraft
Tailless aircraft
Homebuilt aircraft
Mid-wing aircraft
Single-engined pusher aircraft